Saikat Ahamed is an English actor and writer based in Bristol. He is best known for his role of Vince Arya in Monday Monday.

Early life
Ahamed was born in Surrey and grew up in Birmingham, West Midlands, England in the 1980s.

Ahamed attended King Edward's School in Birmingham, and left in 1992. In 1995, he graduated with a degree in broadcast journalism from Cardiff University. He then studied acting at the London Centre for Theatre Studies. He was twice Gold champion in Ballroom and Latin American dance.

Ahamed mother's, Hashi, grew up in a war torn Barisal, Bangladesh, trained as a doctor and made her way to the United Kingdom to provide an easier life for her children. His father is general practitioner Ahamed's family moved from Bangladesh in 1972 to the UK, where he was born and has lived since.

Career
Since 1999, Ahamed has been an actor working on stage, screen and radio. His work on television and film includes, the regular part of Vince Arya in Monday Monday, East Is East and Trollied.

Ahamed's acting work includes A Fine Balance with Tamasha at Hampstead Theatre, a National Tour of Journey to the West with Tara Arts. At Tobacco Factory Theatre, he played Ali Baba in Ali Baba and the Forty Thieves as well as the 'step-brother' in Cinderella, both directed by Sally Cookson. He played the roles of James Henry Trotter in James and the Giant Peach at the Polka Theatre, Ben Gunn in Treasure Island at Bristol Old Vic and Tinker Bell in Peter Pan at Bristol Old Vic. He played Puck and as well as helped to puppeteer Puck in Midsummer Night's Dream at Bristol Old Vic, His theatre work also includes shows at The Kennedy Centre as well as stints at Oldham Coliseum Theatre, Leicester Haymarket Theatre and Man Mela.

As a writer, Ahamed has completed a number of plays. In February 2013, he performed his one-man show The Tiger and the Moustache at the Tobacco Factory Theatre in Bristol. In 2015, he performed his one-man show Strictly Balti: at The Gilded Balloon during the Edinburgh Festival Fringe in August, at the Tobacco Factory Theatre in October and Birmingham Repertory Theatre in November, before embarking on a national tour.

Since 2005, Ahamed has also worked as a professional storyteller, weaving his traditional tales in schools, restaurants, libraries and festivals in Bristol. In 2006, also received the Norman Beaton Fellowship from BBC Radio Drama and has worked regularly for them ever since.

In December 2011, Ahamed's first radio play, Telling Tales, was commissioned and aired on the BBC Asian Network.

In February 2015, Ahamed was interviewed on BBC Somerset. In November and December 2015, he was interviewed by Nadia Ali on BBC Asian Network. In October 2022, he portrayed the role of Nabil Rahim in the BBC soap opera Doctors.

Personal life
Ahamed lives in Bristol with his wife, Jenny, and two children.

Filmography

Film

Television

Stage

Radio

See also
 British Bangladeshi
 List of British Bangladeshis

References

External links
 
 
 Thomson, Wendy. Interview with actor and playwright Saikat Ahamed. Female Arts. 11 July 2015

1970s births
Living people
Year of birth missing (living people)
English Muslims
English people of Bangladeshi descent
English male film actors
English male television actors
English male stage actors
English male radio actors
English male actors of South Asian descent
21st-century English male actors
Male actors from Birmingham, West Midlands
People educated at King Edward's School, Birmingham
Alumni of Cardiff University